The carp prettyfin (Fraudella carassiops) is a species of ray-finned fish from the family Plesiopidae, the longfins or roundheads. It is endemic to Australia where it occurs over soft substrates. It is the only species in its genus.

References  

Fish described in 1935
Plesiopinae
Monotypic fish genera